The ceremonial county of Devon, 
which includes the unitary authorities of 
Torbay and Plymouth,
is divided into 12 Parliamentary constituencies: 4 Borough constituencies
and 8 County constituencies.

Constituencies

2010 boundary changes
Under the Fifth Periodic Review of Westminster constituencies, the Boundary Commission for England decided to increase the number of seats in Devon from 11 to 12, with the creation of Central Devon, which impacted on neighbouring constituencies. An adjusted Teignbridge constituency was renamed Newton Abbot.  Plymouth, Devonport, and Plymouth, Sutton were renamed Plymouth, Moor View, and Plymouth, Sutton and Devonport respectively following a small realignment of the boundary between the two constituencies.

Proposed boundary changes 
See 2023 Periodic Review of Westminster constituencies for further details.

Following the abandonment of the Sixth Periodic Review (the 2018 review), the Boundary Commission for England formally launched the 2023 Review on 5 January 2021. Initial proposals were published on 8 June 2021 and, following two periods of public consultation, revised proposals were published on 8 November 2022. Final proposals will be published by 1 July 2023.

The commission has proposed that Devon be combined with Avon and Somerset as a sub-region of the South West Region, resulting in significant change to the existing pattern of constituencies. In Devon, East Devon, and Tiverton and Honiton would disappear, being replaced by Exeter East and Exmouth, Honiton and Sidmouth, and the cross-county boundary constituency of Tiverton and Minehead. Torridge and West Devon and Totnes would be renamed Torridge and Tavistock, and South Devon respectively. The following seats are proposed:

Containing electoral wards from East Devon
Exeter East and Exmouth (part)
Honiton and Sidmouth (part)
Containing electoral wards from Exeter
Exeter
Exeter East and Exmouth (part)
Containing electoral wards from Mid Devon
Central Devon (part)
Honiton and Sidmouth (part)
Tiverton and Minehead (part in the Somerset District of Somerset West and Taunton)
Containing electoral wards from North Devon
North Devon
Containing electoral wards from Plymouth
Plymouth Moor View
Plymouth Sutton and Devonport
South West Devon (part)
Containing electoral wards from South Hams
South West Devon (part)
South Devon (part)
Containing electoral wards from Teignbridge
Central Devon (part)
Newton Abbot
Containing electoral wards from Torbay
Torbay
South Devon (part)
Containing electoral wards from Torridge
Torridge and Tavistock (part)
Containing electoral wards from West Devon
Central Devon (part)
South West Devon (part)
Torridge and Tavistock (part)

Results history
Primary data source: House of Commons research briefing - General election results from 1918 to 2019

2019 
The number of votes cast for each political party who fielded candidates in constituencies comprising Devon in the 2019 general election were as follows:

Percentage votes 

1Includes National Liberal Party up to 1966 and one National candidate in 1945

2pre-1979 - Liberal; 1983 & 1987 - SDP-Liberal Alliance

* Included in Other

Meaningful vote percentages are not available for the elections of 1918, 1922, 1923, 1931 and 1935 since at least one seat was gained unopposed.

Seats 

1Includes National Liberal Party up to 1966

21950-1979 - Liberal; 1983 & 1987 - SDP-Liberal Alliance

Maps

Historical results by party
A cell marked → (with a different colour background to the preceding cell) indicates that the previous MP continued to sit under a new party name.

1885 to 1918 (13 MPs)

1918 to 1950 (11 MPs)

1950 to 1983 (10 MPs)

1983 to present (11, then 12 MPs)

See also
 List of constituencies in South West England

Notes

References

Devon
 Devon
 
Parliamentary constituencies